The minelayer HNoMS Glommen was built for the Royal Norwegian Navy during World War I, as the lead ship of the two ship Glommen class of mine layers. Her sister ship was Laugen.
Glommen and her sister ship were kept in service until the German invasion of Norway in 1940. Glommen surrendered to the Germans on 14 April 1940, and was rebuilt as a floating anti-aircraft battery. She was scuttled at Kirkenes in 1944 by the retreating Germans.

Glommen was built at Akers mekaniske verksted in Kristiania.

She was named after the Glomma - the longest and largest river in Norway.

See also
 List of World War II ships of less than 1000 tons

External links
 Naval history via FLIX: Glommen, retrieved 17 March 2006

Ships built in Oslo
Glommen-class minelayers
Naval ships of Norway captured by Germany during World War II
World War II minelayers of Norway
Shipwrecks in the Barents Sea
World War II shipwrecks in the Arctic Ocean
1916 ships
Maritime incidents in November 1944